Gakul Saikia is an Indian politician. He was elected to the Lok Sabha, the lower house of the Parliament of India, as a member of the Asom Gana Parishad.

References

India MPs 1989–1991
Lok Sabha members from Assam
Living people
Year of birth missing (living people)
Asom Gana Parishad politicians